Hřibojedy is a municipality and village in Trutnov District in the Hradec Králové Region of the Czech Republic. It has about 200 inhabitants.

Administrative parts
The village of Hvězda is an administrative part of Hřibojedy.

References

Villages in Trutnov District